Leon R. White (born September 26, 1950) is an American guitarist, author of instructional guitar books, producer, and studio musician. He is also a performer, producer, composer, software producer, and luthier. He has written and edited over 40 books including the guitar instructional books Sight to Sound and Styles for the Studio as well as co-producing the album titled Solo Guitar performed by his friend, Ted Greene.

Early life
White began working during school repairing guitars and amplifiers at local music stores. He started his professional music career as a sideman playing guitar, bass, and five-string banjo.

Publishing
Sight to Sound and Styles for the Studio, White's first books, were released in the era of traditional publishing. He later became one of the first adopters of blended media teaching solutions with insert records in books, and companion record albums.

Recording
White has worked as a recording engineer and jack-of-all-audio trades on movie and TV recording projects, and produced electronic Foley for that medium. During his studio mixing years, White wrote early computer software to control studio consoles for film/score syncing.

Instruments and sound
White builds custom semi-hollow body guitars under the brand Sunset Guitars. His history with vintage instruments and work with musical instruments and electronics has led him to build custom guitars with proprietary pickups and tone control.

Effects
White's earlier company, Professional Music Products, distributed music books. Professional Music Products also produced early versions of highly sought after Buffer Pedals from Paul Rivera of Rivera Amplifiers. Rivera and White introduced the  Hot Sink and Super Sink power soaks. (Direct Recording Interfaces of this type were designed to safely reduce volume from over-driven amplifiers while recording). Rivera’s Silent Sister is now the standard for that product.

Associations
White is a founding partner of the new publisher, Six String Logic, LLC to return to his first love of simplifying and accelerating the joy of music for students and players world-wide.

Personal life
White has been married over 35 years. The couple live with their springer spaniel in the Los Angeles area.

References

External links
 Official website
 https://stylesforthestudio.com/

1950 births
Living people
American rock guitarists
American blues guitarists
American jazz guitarists
American luthiers
Musicians from Los Angeles
Guitarists from California